Boston was a parliamentary borough in Lincolnshire, which elected two Members of Parliament (MPs) to the House of Commons from 1547 until 1885, and then one member from 1885 until 1918, when the constituency was abolished.

History
Boston first elected Members of Parliament in 1352–1353, but after that the right lapsed and was not revived again until the reign of Edward VI. The borough consisted of most of the town of Boston, a port and market town on the River Witham which had overgrown its original boundaries as the river had been cleared of silt and its trade developed. In 1831, the population of the borough was 11,240, contained 2,631 houses.

The right to vote belonged to the Mayor, aldermen, members of the common council and all resident freemen of the borough who paid scot and lot. This gave Boston a relatively substantial electorate for the period, 927 votes being cast in 1826 and 565 in 1831. The freedom was generally obtained either by birth (being the son of an existing freemen) or servitude (completing an apprenticeship in the town), but could also be conferred as an honorary status, and Boston charged a consistently escalating sum to its Parliamentary candidates who wanted to be admitted as freemen - set at £20 in 1700, it was raised to £50 in 1719, to £100 in 1790 and to £135 in 1800.

Major local landowners had some influence over election outcomes through deference of the voters - the Duke of Ancaster, for example, was generally allowed to choose one of the members up to the end of the 18th century - but in the last few years before the Reform Act at least one of the two members seems consistently to have been the free choice of the people of the town. However, bribery was rife in some of the early 19th-century elections, and the election of Thomas Fydell in 1802 was overturned when it was discovered that not only had he been paying electors five guineas for a vote, but that many of these were not qualified to vote anyway. (They were freemen not resident in the borough, whose names had been fraudulently entered as paying the poor rate at houses where they did not live, so as to appear eligible.)

Boston retained both its MPs under the Reform Act, but its boundaries were extended slightly, taking in more of the town and part of the neighbouring parish of Skirbeck. This increased the population of the borough to 12,818, although only 869 of these were eligible to vote in the first election after Reform; this had grown to just over 1,000 by the time of the Second Reform Act, when the widening of the franchise more than doubled it, over 2,500 electors being registered for the 1868 general election which followed. But by the 1870s, electoral corruption had again become a problem in Boston. The result of the 1874 election was overturned for bribery, and a Royal Commission set up to investigate; when the next general election, in 1880, had to be declared void for the same reasons, Boston's representation was suspended for the remainder of the Parliament.

Boston had its right to vote restored for the 1885 election, but the boundary changes which came into effect at the same time slightly reduced the size of the borough and allowed it only one MP. The constituency at this period was mainly middle-class but non-conformists had a strong presence, enabling the Liberals to be competitive where they might otherwise have struggled. The deciding factor which may have tilted the constituency towards the Conservatives in its final years may have been the benefit that the local fisherman saw in Tariff Reform.

The borough was abolished with effect from the general election of 1918, Boston being included in the new Holland with Boston county division.

Boundaries
1832-1885: The old borough of Boston, the parish of Skirbeck, and the hamlet of Skirbeck Quarter, including the Fen Allotment of the hamlet of Skirbeck Quarter, but not the Fen Allotment of the parish of Skirbeck.

1885-1918: The existing parliamentary borough, excluding two detached parts situate to the north of the borough, one in East Fen and one in West Fen, and also excluding a part situate on the north side of the borough in the parishes of Sibsey and Frithville.

Members of Parliament

1547-1640

Back to Members of Parliament

1640-1880

Back to Members of Parliament

1885-1918

Back to Members of Parliament

Elections

Elections in the 1830s

Elections in the 1840s

 
 

  

 

 
 
 

  

 

Duke resigned by accepting the office of Steward of the Chiltern Hundreds in order to contest a by-election at City of London.

 
 
  

Back to elections

Elections in the 1850s
Pelham's death caused a by-election.

 
 

Wire retired from the contest.

 
 
 
 

  

 

Heathcote resigned to contest the 1856 by-election at Rutland.

 
  

 

Herbert's appointment as Recorder of Derby required a by-election.

 

 
 

Back to elections

Elections in the 1860s
Ingram's death caused a by-election.

 

 

 On petition, Parry's election was declared void on grounds of bribery and Staniland was duly elected in his place.

Staniland then resigned, causing a by-election.

Back to elections

Elections in the 1870s

 

 An election petition found extensive bribery relating to Parry's votes, which on the initial count totalled 1,347. However, 353 of these were struck off - and further may have been taken if the process had not stopped on 8 June 1874 - leading to Malcolm's election instead. A Royal Commission was established to investigate the borough. A separate petition against Ingram was dropped.

In 1878, Malcolm then resigned in order to contest a by-election in Argyllshire, leading to a by-election in Boston.

Back to elections

Elections in the 1880s

Bribery convictions led to the Boston writ being suspended and the 1880 result being voided. The seat was again reconstituted in 1885, when it was reduced to one member.

Back to elections

Elections in the 1890s

Back to elections

Elections in the 1900s

Back to elections

Elections in the 1910s

General Election 1914–15:

Another General Election was required to take place before the end of 1915. The political parties had been making preparations for an election to take place and by July 1914, the following candidates had been selected; 
Unionist: Charles Harvey Dixon
Liberal: F. Stapleton Hiley
Back to Top

References

Sources
 D Brunton & D H Pennington, Members of the Long Parliament (London: George Allen & Unwin, 1954)
 Cobbett's Parliamentary history of England, from the Norman Conquest in 1066 to the year 1803 (London: Thomas Hansard, 1808) 
 F W S Craig, British Parliamentary Election Results 1832-1885 (2nd edition, Aldershot: Parliamentary Research Services, 1989)
 J. E. Neale, The Elizabethan House of Commons (London: Jonathan Cape, 1949)
 T. H. B. Oldfield, The Representative History of Great Britain and Ireland (London: Baldwin, Cradock & Joy, 1816)
 Henry Pelling, Social Geography of British Elections, 1885-1910 (London: Macmillan, 1967)
 J Holladay Philbin, Parliamentary Representation 1832 - England and Wales (New Haven: Yale University Press, 1965)
 Edward Porritt and Annie G Porritt, The Unreformed House of Commons (Cambridge University Press, 1903)
 Frederic A Youngs, jr, "Guide to the Local Administrative Units of England, Vol II" (London: Royal Historical Society, 1991)
 Concise Dictionary of National Biography
 

Parliamentary constituencies in Lincolnshire (historic)
Constituencies of the Parliament of the United Kingdom established in 1547
Constituencies of the Parliament of the United Kingdom disestablished in 1918
Boston, Lincolnshire